This article displays the qualifying draw of the 2011 SA Tennis Open.

Players

Seeds

Qualifiers

Lucky losers
  Thiago Alves

Qualifying draw

First qualifier

Second qualifier

Third qualifier

Fourth qualifier

References
 Qualifying Draw

2011 - qualifying
SA Tennis Open - qualifying
2011 in South African tennis